Marco Penna (born 28 July 1972 in Mantua) is an Italian rower who competed in the Olympics in 1996, 2000, and 2004.

References 
 
 

1972 births
Living people
Italian male rowers
Sportspeople from Mantua
Olympic rowers of Italy
Rowers at the 1996 Summer Olympics
Rowers at the 2000 Summer Olympics
Rowers at the 2004 Summer Olympics